25924 Douglasadams, provisional designation , is a Nysian asteroid from the inner regions of the asteroid belt, approximately 2.4 kilometers in diameter. It was discovered on 19 February 2001, by astronomers of the Lincoln Near-Earth Asteroid Research at the Lincoln Laboratory's Experimental Test Site in New Mexico, United States. The asteroid was named for novelist Douglas Adams.

Orbit and classification 

Douglasadams is a member of the Nysa family, better described as the Nysa–Polana complex, as it contains at least three asteroid families with distinct spectral types (SFC). It orbits the Sun in the inner main-belt at a distance of 2.0–2.8 AU once every 3 years and 9 months (1,371 days). Its orbit has an eccentricity of 0.17 and an inclination of 2° with respect to the ecliptic.

The body's observation arc begins with a precovery taken by Spacewatch at Kitt Peak Observatory in January 1997, more than four years prior to its official discovery observation at Lincoln Lab's ETS.

Physical characteristics 

The spectral type of Douglasadams is unknown. Based on its albedo (see below) it is likely a common stony S-type asteroid.

Diameter and albedo 

According to the survey carried out by the NEOWISE mission of NASA's Wide-field Infrared Survey Explorer, Douglasadams measures 2.410 kilometers in diameter and its surface has an albedo of 0.210. It has an absolute magnitude of 15.6.

Rotation period 

As of 2017, no rotational lightcurve of Douglasadams has been obtained from photometric observations. The asteroid's rotation period, poles and shape remain unknown.

Naming 

This minor planet was named in memory of English novelist Douglas Adams (1952–2001), because its provisional designation  happened to contain the year of his death, his initials, and the Answer to the Ultimate Question of Life, the Universe, and Everything (42), as given in his novel serial The Hitchhiker's Guide to the Galaxy. The official naming citation was published by the Minor Planet Center on 25 January 2005.

The asteroid 18610 Arthurdent, discovered by Felix Hormuth in 1998, was named after the bewildered hero of Douglas Adams's The Hitchhikers Guide to the Galaxy.

References

External links 
 Asteroid named after ‘Hitchhiker’ humorist: Late British sci-fi author honored after cosmic campaign by Alan Boyle, MSNBC, 2005
 Asteroid Lightcurve Database (LCDB), query form (info )
 Dictionary of Minor Planet Names, Google books
 Asteroids and comets rotation curves, CdR – Observatoire de Genève, Raoul Behrend
 Discovery Circumstances: Numbered Minor Planets (25001)-(30000) – Minor Planet Center
 
 

025924
025924
Named minor planets
25924 Douglasadams
20010219